The Lotus 43 was a Formula One racing car designed by Colin Chapman for the 1966 season. Hampered by its heavy and unreliable BRM engine, it won only one race, the 1966 United States Grand Prix.

Concept
The Lotus 43 was partially based on the Lotus 38 Indycar, due to Chapman's experience at Indy with larger engine capacity and tyre/suspension setup. The car was designed in this way in response to new regulations which came into force in 1966, which increased the engine capacity to 3 litres. Along with newer, wider tyres better able to handle the power of the larger engines, the need for a more robust design was obvious.

Cosworth were developing a new engine for Lotus, the DFV, to be introduced for the 1967 Formula One season, and in the meantime Chapman made a deal for use of the BRM P75 H16 engine. The P75 on paper was technically advanced and powerful, and Chapman had hopes that it would power his cars to another successful season.

The first sign of trouble was when the H16 engine arrived and it required four men to lift it from the truck. The engine proved to be overweight, unreliable and was unable to produce the promised power.

Engine problems aside, the 43 chassis was an excellent design and elements of it were used in its 1967 successor, the far more successful Lotus 49, including the use of the engine as a stressed structural member which bore weight and to which the rear suspension was attached.

Racing history

1966
The car was supposed to debut at the 1966 Monaco Grand Prix, driven by Peter Arundell, but it was unavailable. Its first outing at the following Belgian Grand Prix ended during practice, when the engine gave out.

The 43 reappeared at the Italian Grand Prix but retired with gearbox failure. Clark then won the United States Grand Prix at Watkins Glen, the only race win for the P75 engine, using a spare engine loaned by the BRM team. However, gearbox failure again led to the 43's retirement from the final race of the season, the Mexican Grand Prix.

1967
In 1967 the 43 made its final appearance at the South African Grand Prix at the Kyalami circuit, where Clark and new team mate Graham Hill both retired their cars.

Only two cars were built and were later sold to Robert Lamplough and Jock Russell, who fitted them with 4.7 litre Ford V8 engines and competed in Formula 5000 events.

Complete results

Formula One World Championship results
(key)

 Total points scored by all Lotus-BRM cars, including 4 points scored by drivers of Lotus 33 variants.   Total points scored by all Lotus-BRM cars, including 6 points scored by drivers of Lotus 33 variants.

Non-championship Formula One results
(key)

PC simulation
A driveable, detailed reconstruction of the Lotus 43 (with matching car physics) appeared in 2007 in the freely-available '66 Mod' for the PC-based racing simulation Grand Prix Legends.

References

43